Frances Sutah (Polly) Smith (December 29, 1908 – June 18, 1980) was an important Texas photographer whose work showcased Texas life to the world during the 1930s-1940s. Though not as critically acclaimed as contemporaries Margaret Bourke-White or Dorothea Lange, her work broke new ground in Texas.

Biography
After growing up in various Texas towns, Polly studied photography at the Clarence Hudson White School of Photography in New York City. In 1935 she was hired as a freelance photographer by the Texas Centennial Exposition to promote the Texas centennial. She was the first photographer to take photos for state marketing and tourism purposes.

She travelled alone across the state documenting Texas life. Initially staying in hotels along her route, she accumulating negatives and periodically stopped to develop them. Later a dark room was built onto the back of a truck, allowing her to drive around the state and develop her work along the road. Her photographs appeared with hundreds of articles across the country in magazines like House Beautiful, Pictorial Review, Furniture Age, Architectural Forum, and many others. Texas Parade called Polly "one of Texas' finest artists with the camera," and stated that any illustrated book on Texas was likely to contain one or more of her "unusual" shots. Today, some of her photos are permanently mounted in the Hall of State at Fair Park in Dallas.

After her work for the exposition, she was commissioned by various corporations to shoot series of pictures on specific subjects, including cotton, cowboys, and oil. She also shot a series on airplanes for American Airways and the Dallas Aviation School.

Smith returned to Austin in 1944 where she attended the University of Texas, studying sculpture and Impressionistic painting until health concerns forced her to end her studies. She continued to paint and sculpt but fought cancer and debilitating illness for the rest of her life. She died in Auburn, California, on June 18, 1980.

References

External links
 Handbook of Texas
 A Texas Journey, The Centennial Photographs of Polly Smith

American photojournalists
1908 births
1980 deaths
People from Ruston, Louisiana
20th-century American women photographers
20th-century American photographers
Women photojournalists